Riley County (standard abbreviation: RL) is a county located in the U.S. state of Kansas. As of the 2020 census, the population was 71,959. The largest city and county seat is Manhattan.

Riley County is home to two of Kansas's largest employers: Fort Riley and Kansas State University.

History
Riley County, named for Mexican–American War general Bennet Riley, was on the western edge of the 33 original counties established by the Kansas Territorial Legislature in August 1855. For organizational purposes, Riley County initially had attached to it Geary County and all land west of Riley County, across Kansas Territory into present-day Colorado.

The first Territorial Capital of Kansas Territory was located in the boundaries of Riley County, in the former town of Pawnee. The site now falls within the boundaries of Fort Riley, a U.S. Army post.

Manhattan was selected as county seat in contentious fashion. In late 1857, an election was held to select the county seat, with Ogden prevailing. However, Manhattanites suspected election fraud, and were eventually able to prove that a number of votes were illegally cast. Sheriff David A. Butterfield was forced to secure the county's books and records for Manhattan, and Manhattan was finally officially declared the county seat in 1858.

On May 30, 1879, the "Irving, Kansas Tornado" began in Riley County. Eighteen people were killed and sixty were injured.

Geography

The eastern border of the county follows the former course of the Big Blue River.  The river was dammed in the 1960s and Tuttle Creek Lake was created as a result.  The county falls within the Flint Hills region of the state.

Adjacent counties
 Marshall County (northeast)
 Pottawatomie County (east)
 Wabaunsee County (southeast)
 Geary County (south)
 Clay County (west)
 Washington County (northwest)

Demographics

Riley County is part of the Manhattan, KS Metropolitan Statistical Area. Millennials (ages 15–34 years old) make up 53.6% of the population of Riley County, one of the highest rates in the United States.

2000 census
As of the census of 2000, there were 62,843 people, 22,137 households, and 12,263 families residing in the county. The racial makeup of the county was 84.78% White, 6.88% Black or African American, 0.63% Native American, 3.22% Asian, 0.17% Pacific Islander, 1.89% from other races, and 2.43% from two or more races. 4.57% of the population were Hispanic or Latino of any race.

There were 22,137 households, out of which 27.80% had children under the age of 18 living with them, 46.20% were married couples living together, 6.80% had a female householder with no husband present, and 44.60% were non-families. 27.50% of all households were made up of individuals, and 6.10% had someone living alone who was 65 years of age or older. The average household size was 2.42 and the average family size was 2.99.

In the county, the population was spread out, with 18.80% under the age of 18, 34.50% from 18 to 24, 25.90% from 25 to 44, 13.30% from 45 to 64, and 7.50% who were 65 years of age or older. The median age was 24 years. For every 100 females, there were 114.30 males. For every 100 females age 18 and over, there were 115.40 males.

The median income for a household in the county was $32,042, and the median income for a family was $46,489. Males had a median income of $26,856 versus $23,835 for females. The per capita income for the county was $16,349. About 8.50% of families and 20.60% of the population were below the poverty line, including 11.20% of those under age 18 and 6.70% of those age 65 or over.

Government
Riley County is governed by three county commissioners, John Ford, Marvin Rodriguez, and Ron Wells.

Presidential elections

Owing to its history of Yankee anti-slavery settlement in “Bleeding Kansas” days, Riley County became strongly Republican following Kansas statehood, except when over half of its voters supported Progressive Theodore Roosevelt in 1912 who himself was a Republican who had broken away from the party in that election cycle. Being relatively resistant to the Democratic populism of William Jennings Bryan, Woodrow Wilson and Franklin D. Roosevelt, Riley County stood as the westernmost of thirty-eight US counties to have never voted Democratic for President since the Civil War.  However, it was the only one whose status as “never Democratic” stood significantly threatened in 2016 and 2020: Hillary Clinton's losing margin of only 3.5 percent was the second-closest any Democrat has come to claiming the county behind her husband in the divided 1992 election.

In the 2018 Gubernatorial Election in Kansas, Democratic candidate Laura Kelly won Riley County by a 24-point margin, and in the 2018 US House Election in KS-01, Republican candidate Roger Marshall lost Riley County by a 2-point margin.

2020 became a historic election for Riley County, as, even though he lost the state, Joe Biden won the county 50.7% to 46.1%, the first Democratic presidential win in Riley County's history.

In the 2022 anti-abortion constitutional amendment referendum preliminary results showed "No" leading by a margin of 36.8%. 

Riley County is the only county in Kansas without an elected sheriff; the county police department handles all the Sheriff's functions.

Laws
Riley County was a prohibition, or "dry", county until the Kansas Constitution was amended in 1986 and voters approved the sale of alcoholic liquor by the individual drink with a 30 percent food sales requirement.  The food sales requirement was removed with voter approval in 2004.

The county voted "No" on the 2022 Kansas Value Them Both Amendment, an anti-abortion ballot measure, by 68% to 32%, outpacing its support of Joe Biden during the 2020 presidential election.

Education

Colleges and universities
 Kansas State University
 Manhattan Christian College
 Manhattan Area Technical College

Unified school districts
 Riley County USD 378
 Manhattan-Ogden USD 383
 Blue Valley USD 384

Communities

Cities
 Leonardville
 Manhattan, also partly in Pottawatomie County
 Ogden
 Randolph
 Riley

Unincorporated communities
 Ashland
 Bala
 Keats
 Rocky Ford
 Zeandale

Ghost towns
 Lasita
 Walsburg
 May Day

These former places were flooded when Tuttle Creek Lake was created in the 1950s and 1960s.  Randolph was also flooded, but moved a mile west of its original location.

 Cleburne
 Garrison Cross
 Stockdale
 Winkler

Fort Riley
The fort has a daytime population of nearly 25,000 and includes a census-designated place:
 Fort Riley (formerly "Fort Riley North")

Townships

Riley County is divided into fourteen townships.  The city of Manhattan which is surrounded by Manhattan Township is considered governmentally independent and is excluded from the census figures for Manhattan Township or any other townships.  In the following table, the population center is the largest city (or cities) included in that township's population total, if it is of a significant size.

Notable people
Among notable current and former residents of Riley County are former Governor John W. Carlin, General Glen Edgerton, millionaire miner Horace A. W. Tabor, NFL receiver Jordy Nelson.

See also
 Pillsbury Crossing
 National Register of Historic Places listings in Riley County, Kansas

References

Further reading

 Handbook of Pottawatomie and Riley Counties, Kansas; Modern Ago; 20 pages; 1880s.
 Standard Atlas of Riley County, Kansas; Geo. A. Ogle & Co; 54 pages; 1909.

External links

County
 
 Riley County - Directory of Public Officials
Historical
 The Irving, KS Tornado
 Riley County Kansas AHGP
Maps
 Riley County maps: Current, Historic, KDOT
 Riley County maps:  (historical Township and place maps)
 Kansas highway maps: Current, Historic, KDOT
 Kansas railroad maps: Current, 1996, 1915, KDOT and Kansas Historical Society

 
Kansas counties
1855 establishments in Kansas Territory
Manhattan, Kansas metropolitan area